A handicraft, sometimes more precisely expressed as artisanal handicraft or handmade, is any of a wide variety of types of work where useful and decorative objects are made completely by one’s hand or by using only simple, non-automated related tools like scissors, carving implements, or hooks. It is a traditional main sector of craft making and applies to a wide range of creative and design activities that are related to making things with one's hands and skill, including work with textiles, moldable and rigid materials, paper, plant fibers, clay, etc. One of the oldest handicraft is Dhokra; this is a sort of metal casting that has been used in India for over 4,000 years and is still used. In Iranian Baluchistan, women still make red ware hand-made pottery with dotted ornaments, much similar to the 5000-year-old pottery tradition of Kalpurgan, an archaeological site near the village. Usually, the term is applied to traditional techniques of creating items (whether for personal use or as products) that are both practical and aesthetic. Handicraft industries are those that produce things with hands to meet the needs of the people in their locality without using machines.

Collective terms for handicrafts include artisanry, crafting, and handcrafting. The term arts and crafts is also applied, especially in the United States and mostly to hobbyists' and children's output rather than items crafted for daily use, but this distinction is not formal, and the term is easily confused with the Arts and Crafts design movement, which is in fact as practical as it is aesthetic.

Handicraft has its roots in the rural crafts—the material-goods necessities—of ancient civilizations, and many specific crafts have been practiced for centuries, while others are modern inventions or popularizations of crafts which were originally practiced in a limited geographic area.

Many handcrafters use natural, even entirely indigenous, materials while others may prefer modern, non-traditional materials, and even upcycle industrial materials. The individual artisanship of a handcrafted item is the paramount criterion; those made by mass production or machines are not handicraft goods.

Seen as developing the skills and creative interests of students, generally and sometimes towards a particular craft or trade, handicrafts are often integrated into educational systems, both informally and formally. Most crafts require the development of skill and the application of patience but can be learned by virtually anyone.

Like folk art, handicraft output often has cultural and/or religious significance, and increasingly may have a political message as well, as in craftivism. Many crafts become very popular for brief periods of time (a few months, or a few years), spreading rapidly among the crafting population as everyone emulates the first examples, then their popularity wanes until a later resurgence.

The Arts and Crafts movement in the West

The Arts and Crafts movement originated as late 19th-century design reform and social movement principally in Europe, North America and Australia, and continues today. Its proponents are motivated by the ideals of movement founders such as William Morris and John Ruskin, who proposed that in pre-industrial societies, such as the European Middle Ages, people had achieved fulfillment through the creative process of handicrafts. This was held up in contrast to what was perceived to be the alienating effects of industrial labor.

These activities were called crafts because originally many of them were professions under the guild system. Adolescents were apprenticed to a master craftsman and refined their skills over a period of years in exchange for low wages. By the time their training was complete, they were well equipped to set up in trade for themselves, earning their living with the skill that could be traded directly within the community, often for goods and services. The Industrial Revolution and the increasing mechanization of production processes gradually reduced or eliminated many of the roles professional craftspeople played, and today many handicrafts are increasingly seen, especially when no longer the mainstay of a formal vocational trade, as a form of hobby, folk art and sometimes even fine art.

The term handicrafts can also refer to the products themselves of such artisanal efforts, that require specialized knowledge, maybe highly technical in their execution, require specialized equipment and/or facilities to produce, involve manual labor or a blue-collar work ethic, are accessible to the general public, and are constructed from materials with histories that exceed the boundaries of Western "fine art" tradition, such as ceramics, glass, textiles, metal and wood. These products are produced within a specific community of practice, and while they mostly differ from the products produced within the communities of art and design, the boundaries often overlap, resulting in hybrid objects. Additionally, as the interpretation and validation of art is frequently a matter of context, an audience may perceive handcrafted objects as art objects when these objects are viewed within an art context, such as in a museum or in a position of prominence in one's home.

In modern education

Simple "arts and crafts" projects are a common elementary and middle school activity in both mainstream and alternative education systems around the world.

In some of the Scandinavian countries, more advanced handicrafts form part of the formal, compulsory school curriculum, and are collectively referred to as slöjd in Swedish, and käsityö (or veisto) in Finnish. Students learn how to work mainly with metal, textile and wood, not for professional training purposes as in American vocational–technical schools, but with the aim to develop children's and teens' practical skills, such as everyday problem-solving ability, tool use, and understanding of the materials that surround us for economical, cultural and environmental purposes.

Secondary schools and college and university art departments increasingly provide elective options for more handicraft-based arts, in addition to formal "fine arts", a distinction that continues to fade throughout the years, especially with the rise of studio craft, i.e. the use of traditional handicrafts techniques by professional fine artists.

Many community centers and schools run evening or day classes and workshops, for adults and children, offering to teach basic craft skills in a short period of time.

List of common handicrafts
There are almost as many variations on the theme of handicrafts as there are crafters with time on their hands, but they can be broken down into a number of categories:

Using textiles or leather
Bagh prints
Banner-making
Batik
Calligraphy
Carpet
Canvas work
Cross-stitch
Crochet
Darning
Dyeing yarns
Embossing leather
Embroidery
Felting
Knitting
Lace-making
Leather crafting
Lucet
Macrame
Millinery (hat making)
Needlepoint
Needlework generally
Patchwork
Quilting
Ribbon embroidery
Rug making
Saddle making
Sewing generally
Shoe making (cordwainning)
Silkscreening
Spinning (textiles)
String art
Tapestry
Tatting
T-shirt art
Tunisian Crochet
Weaving
Bagru Print
Handmade Bags

Using wood, metal, clay, bone, horn, glass, or stone
Bead work
Bone carving (buffalo, camel, etc., as well as horn and
Brass broidered coconut shell craft of Kerala
Carpentry
Ceramic art generally
Chip carving
Copper arts
Dollhouse construction and furnishing
Doll making
Enameling and Grisaille
Fretwork
Glass etching
Glassblowing
Jewelry design
Joining (woodworking)
Lapidary
Lath art
Marquetry
Metalwork
Mosaics
Pottery
Puppet making
Repoussé and chasing (embossing metal)
Scale modeling
Sculpture
Silversmithing
Stained glass
Toy making
Wood burning (pyrography)
Wood carving
Wood turning
Woodworking generally

Using paper or canvas
Altered books
Artist trading cards
Assemblage, collage in three dimensions
Bookbinding
Cardmaking
Collage
Décollage
Decoupage
Embossing paper
Iris folding
Origami or paper folding
Paper craft generally
Paper making
Paper marbling
Paper modeling, paper craft or card modeling
Papier-mâché
Parchment craft
Pop-up books
Quilling or paper filigree
Rubber/acrylic stamping
Scrapbooking

Using plants other than wood
Basket weaving
Corn dolly making
Floral design
Pressed flower craft
Soapmaking
Straw marquetry

Other
Balloon animals
Cake decorating
Candlemaking
Egg decorating

Sales venues
Handicrafts are often made for home use and decor. If sold, they are sold in direct sales, gift shops, public markets, and online shopping. In developing countries, handicrafts are sold to locals and as souvenirs to tourists. Sellers tend to speak at least a few words of common tourist languages.  There are also specialty markets such as:
Pike Place Public Market of Seattle
Street Artists Program of San Francisco
Ann Arbor Art Fairs
International Art and Craft Fair, Ouagadougou

See also
Bagh Print
Maker culture
Screw pine craft of Kerala
Sloyd
Fully feathered basket
Artisan

References

 
Decorative arts
Visual arts